is a  high lattice tower with an observation deck at a height of 100 metres in Naka Ward, Yokohama, Japan.

The light characteristic is marked by a flash every twenty seconds, whereby the light's colour is alternating red and green. Originally, at night, the tower shaft itself was lit green and red according to its markings, but now, after the reopening in May 2009, the lights are white.

History
Yokohama Marine Tower was inaugurated in 1961. The Marine Tower is billed "the tallest lighthouse in the world", although this depends on what lighthouses are considered. In clear conditions, visitors can see Mount Fuji from the 100-metre high observation deck.

On December 25, 2006, Marine Tower temporarily shut its doors. Then the city of Yokohama took over ownership, to restore it. After the renovations, Marine Tower was reopened on May 23, 2009, in time for the city's 150th anniversary celebrations.

In popular culture
Ghidorah, the Three-Headed Monster
Godzilla vs. Mothra
Godzilla, Mothra and King Ghidorah: Giant Monsters All-Out Attack
Digimon Data Squad
Digimon Savers: Ultimate Power! Activate Burst Mode!!
Superior Ultraman 8 Brothers
Revolutionary Girl Utena
From Up On Poppy Hill

See also

 List of lighthouses in Japan
 List of tallest lighthouses in the world

References

External links

 Yokohama Marine Tower official website 
 マリンタワー再生事業, the City of Yokohama's project to restore the Marine Tower 
 

Naka-ku, Yokohama
Marine Tower
Lighthouses completed in 1961
Lighthouses in Japan
Observation towers in Japan
Tourist attractions in Yokohama
1961 establishments in Japan